Helenoconcha is a genus of small air-breathing land snails, terrestrial pulmonate gastropod mollusks in the family Charopidae endemic to the island of Saint Helena, hence the genetic epithet.  All species save for H. relicta, are extinct.

Species
Species within the genus Helenoconcha include:
 Helenoconcha leptalea
 Helenoconcha minutissima
 Helenoconcha polyodon
 Helenoconcha pseustes
 Helenoconcha relicta
 Helenoconcha sexdentata

References

 
Charopidae
Taxonomy articles created by Polbot